Peter Cox may refer to:

Peter Cox (author), British vegetarian book author
Peter Cox (cricketer) (born 1954), Australian cricketer
Peter Cox (politician) (1925–2008), Australian politician
Peter Cox (musician) (born 1955), English singer-songwriter, member of Go West
Peter Cox (album), 1997 album from Go West member Peter Cox
Peter Arthur Cox (1922–2018), British civil engineer
Peter Cox Jr. (born 1967), American fencer
Peter Cox (climatologist), professor of climate system dynamics